Love and Honor is the seventh studio album (ninth overall) by country music artist Ricky Van Shelton and his last album for Columbia Records. This is also his first album of his career not to be produced by Steve Buckingham. Two singles released from this album, "Wherever She Is", and "Lola's Love" charted outside the top 40. "Lola's Love" was originally recorded by Sawyer Brown and featured on their 1987 album, Somewhere in the Night. "Where the Tall Grass Grows" was originally recorded by George Jones on his 1991 album And Along Came Jones.

Track listing
"Wherever She Is" (James House, John Jarrard) - 2:50
"Complicated" (Bill LaBounty, Pat McLaughlin) - 3:07
"Lola's Love" (Dennis Linde) - 3:09
"I Thought I'd Heard It All" (Deryl Dodd, Philip Douglas, Don Pfrimmer) - 3:40
"Then for Them" (Larry Boone, Will Robinson) - 3:03
"Baby, Take a Picture" (Carol Chase, Kathy Louvin, Russell Smith) - 2:25
"Love Without You" (Jeff Pearson, Charles Quillen) - 3:02
"Been There, Done That" (John Jarrard, Craig Wiseman) - 3:23
"Love and Honor" (Merle Haggard) - 3:05
"Where the Tall Grass Grows" (Randy Boudreaux, Kerry Kurt Phillips, Andy Spooner) - 3:22
"Thanks a Lot" (Eddie Miller, Don Sessions) - 3:17

Release history

Personnel
Musicians

 Tigar Bell - fiddle (10)
 Darin Favorite - electric guitar (10,11)
 Paul Franklin - steel guitar (1, 2, 4, 7), dobro (1, 2, 4, 7)
 Sonny Garrish - steel guitar (8,9)
 Kenny Greenberg - acoustic guitar (1,2,3,8), electric guitar (1,2,3,8)
 Rob Hajacos - fiddle (8,9)
 Owen Hale - drums (1,2,4-7)
 Tommy Hannum - steel guitar (10,11), acoustic guitar (10,11)
 Bruce Harrison - keyboards (10,11)
 George Honea - drums (10,11)
 Paul Leim - drums (3,8,9)
 Dennis Linde - acoustic guitar, special effects, clavinet (3)
 Charlie McCoy - harmonica (2)
 Terry McMillan - percussion (3,5)
 Larry Marrs - bass (1-9)
 Steve Nathan - piano (1,2,4-7)
 Hank Singer - fiddle (1,6)
 Ricky Van Shelton - lead vocals (all tracks)
 Gary Smith - piano (8,9)
 Tommy Sprulock - steel guitar (5,6)
 Rocky Thacker - bass (10,11)
 Biff Watson - acoustic guitar (1,2,4-7)
 John Willis - electric guitar (1,4-9), mandolin (1,4-9)
 Paul Worley - acoustic guitar (1,2,5,8,10)

Background Vocals
 Larry Marrs (all tracks)
 Russell Terrell (1,4-11)
 Harry Stinson (2)
 Tony King (3)
 Tom Flora (3)
 Bergen White (3)

Production
 Production Assistant: Carl Landers
 Recorded and Mixed By: Chuck Ainlay & Graham Lewis
 Engineers: Tim Farmer, Mark Frigo & Graham Lewis
 Mastered By: Denny Purcell
 Art Direction: Bill Johnson
 Photography: Frank Ockenfels
 Design: Beth Kindig
 Art Assistance: Gregory MacLachlan

Chart performance

1994 albums
Albums produced by Paul Worley
Columbia Records albums
Ricky Van Shelton albums
Albums produced by Blake Chancey